Triumph is a name that was given to a koala who was born without a posterior limb and was rescued in 2017 by a veterinary nurse Marley Christian in northern New South Wales, Australia. Triumph is known to be the first koala to receive a limb prosthesis in the world.

References

Koalas
Individual mammals